Storm Seeker is a German pirate-folk-metal band from Düsseldorf and Neuss. It was founded by the brothers Marius and Timo Bornfleth.

History 
The band was founded in 2013. After multiple lineup changes, they released the EP Pirate Scum in 2016 via the label Aeterna Records. Within time, the band played increasingly large concerts, festivals and international gigs, such as Dong Open Air 2017 and Metaldays 2018. In 2018, guitarist Patrick Stäudle left the band. Due to that, Marius Bornfleth took over the guitar and Julian Hauptvogel joined the band to play the drums. At the end of 2018, Patricia Büchler left the band. For the Tanz und Triebe Tour 2019, Fabienne Kirschke ("Fabi") was found as a replacement. After the tour, she became a permanent member.

The first album Beneath in the Cold was released on 18 May 2019. In the same year, some singles and music videos were released.

In 2020 they switched to the label NoCut from Hamburg and re-released their first album Beneath in the Cold with them.

Within the Covid-Year 2020, they played a headliner gig, three concerts with Mono Inc and at the Online Musik Festival. In the same year, drummer Julian Hauptvogel left the band.

The second album Guns Don’t Cry was released on 29 January 2021. It contains special appearances from Mr. Hurley & die Pulveraffen, Sebastian Levermann from Orden Ogan, and Tanzwut.

In September 2021, they announced a new upcoming album called Calm Seas Vol. 1, to be released on 26 November 2021. The album will feature acoustic versions of previously released songs, as well as the two traditional songs they covered in 2021 (see Discography). After the album was released, cellist Sandra Schmitt left the band. As of mid-2022, she still hasn't been replaced.

On 29 July 2022 the band announced that Paul Martens had joined on guitars.

Musical style 
Besides guitar, bass, drums, keyboards and rough male main vocals, Storm Seeker's music features a Hurdy Gurdy, a cello, flutes and a Nyckelharpa. On some songs, Fabi and Sandy also sing, either solo parts or sometimes an entire song (such as One More Day, where Fabi is the sole singer). The style defines itself over the whole range of Folk-Metal. The band describes itself as "a mix of boozy folk music with strong, breaking metal riffs and a pinch of epicness". The band's repertoire contains progressive, serious and long pieces as well as party-friendly Drinking songs. Topics are primary nautical themes and piracy.

Members

Current members 

 Timo "Timothy Abor" Bornfleth – lead vocals, bass guitar (2013–present)
 Marius "Olaf Abor" Bornfleth – drums, percussion (2013–2018, 2020–present), backing vocals (2013–present), guitars (2018–2022)
 Tim "Ughar der Schrecklich Durstige" Braatz – keyboards, accordion (2015–present)
 Fabienne "Fabi" Kirschke – hurdy-gurdy, recorders, backing and lead vocals (2019–present)
 Paul Martens – guitars (2022–present)

Former members 

 Sandra "Sandy McGnomsen" Schmitt – cello, nyckelharpa, backing vocals (2013–2021), lead vocals (2018–2021)
 Wanda Schikarski – keyboards, whistles (2013–2014)
 Andreas Schaffrath – guitars (2013–2014)
 Patrick Stäudle – guitars, backing vocals (2015–2018)
 Patricia "Patty Gurdy" Büchler – hurdy-gurdy, whistles, backing and lead vocals (2015–2018)
 Julian "Ju" Hauptvogel – drums, percussion (2018–2020)

Timeline

Discography

Studio albums

EPs

Singles/Music videos

References

External links 
 Storm Seeker on Discogs
 Storm Seeker on MusicBrainz
 Official Website

Musical groups established in 2013
German folk metal musical groups
Musical groups from Düsseldorf
2013 establishments in Germany